Johnny White (January 18, 1932 – December 24, 1977), was an American racecar driver.

Born in Warren, Michigan, White died in Indianapolis, Indiana.  He drove in the USAC Championship Car series, racing in the 1963 and 1964 seasons, with 11 career starts, including the 1964 Indianapolis 500.  He finished in the top ten 7 times, with his best finish in 4th position at the 1964 Indianapolis 500, which earned him Rookie of the Year.

The career of Johnny White came to an end on June 7, 1964, when he was paralyzed from the neck down after flipping his sprint car and rolling along the top of the guard rail at the Terre Haute Action Track. Over the years the injuries that Johnny received eventually took a toll on his overall health, resulting in his death on Christmas Eve, 1977.

Award
White was inducted in the National Sprint Car Hall of Fame in 1999.

References

1932 births
1977 deaths
Indianapolis 500 drivers
Indianapolis 500 Rookies of the Year
National Sprint Car Hall of Fame inductees
Racing drivers from Detroit
Racing drivers from Michigan
Sportspeople from Warren, Michigan
Racing drivers who died while racing